SpaceX Starship's first orbital test flight is expected to launch once SpaceX makes environmental adjustments to Starbase, the planned launch site, as required by the Federal Aviation Administration, and obtains a launch licence. SpaceX plans on using Starship prototypes Ship 24 and Booster 7. The Starship second stage may enter a transatmospheric Earth orbit with a positive perigee in the atmosphere. This will allow Ship 24 to reenter the atmosphere after completing around one orbit without having to restart its engines for a deorbit maneuver.

Background 

Starship is planned to be a fully reusable super heavy-lift launch vehicle, designed by SpaceX. Made up of two stages, Starship is planned to be used for satellite deployment, space tourism, and interplanetary spaceflight.

Mission 
The vehicle will launch from Starbase, at Boca Chica, Texas, on the United States Gulf Coast. The booster and spacecraft will separate about 170 seconds into the flight. More recent filings suggest that SpaceX wants to keep the possibility of catching the Super Heavy booster. As of March 2023, SpaceX is working towards a potential launch date in April 2023, but there have been lots of suggestions that it will be soon from as early as May 2022.

See also
Falcon Heavy test flight
Falcon 9 first-stage landing tests
Dragon Spacecraft Qualification Unit
Ratsat

References 

SpaceX Starship
2023 in spaceflight
2023 in the United States
Test spaceflights